Laos competed at the 2017 Asian Indoor and Martial Arts Games held in Ashgabat, Turkmenistan from September 17 to 27. Laos sent the only competitor in the multi-sport event and the nation finished the competition without receiving any medals.

Participants

References 

2017 in Laotian sport
Nations at the 2017 Asian Indoor and Martial Arts Games